Georges Staquet (1932, in Bruille-lez-Marchiennes – 2011) was a French actor.

Partial filmography

 The Day and the Hour (1963) - L'aubergiste (uncredited)
 Bande à part (1964) - Legionary
 Marie Soleil (1964)
 Pierrot le Fou (1965) - Franck (uncredited)
 Paris brûle-t-il? (1966) - Capitaine Dronne
 Weekend (1967) - Le conducteur du tracteur (uncredited)
 Time to Live (1969) - Enrico
 Atlantic Wall (1970) - Hippolyte, Le chef des résistants
 Le Tueur (1972)
 L'oeuf (1972) - Eugène
 Das Attentat (1972) - L'officier de police Fleury
 Le Sex Shop (1972) - Emile
 Les Rois maudits (1972-1973, TV Mini-Series) - Lormet 
 Sans sommation (1973) - Flic en filature 1
 La bonne année (1973) - Le commissaire de police à Paris
 R.A.S. (1973) - Adjudant Marcellin
 Hail the Artist (1973) - Charles
 France société anonyme (1974) - Le petit nerveux
 Un jour, la fête (1975)
 If I Had to Do It All Over Again (1976)
 La Zizanie (1978) - Le délégué-ouvrier
 Au bout du bout du banc (1979) - Boyer
 Ogro (1979) - El Albañil
 The Police War (1979) - Millard
 I as in Icarus (1979) - Le gardien de l'immeuble de l'assassinat
 The Woman Cop (1980) - Inspecteur Sondy
 Le Maître d'école (1981) - Le père de Gérard
 Hail Mary (1985)
 Red Kiss (1985) - L'Inspecteur du police
 Un été d'orages (1989) - Chef de la Milice
 Life and Nothing But (1989) - Le curé
 A Day to Remember (1991) - Alain
 IP5 (1992) - Jean-Marie
 Germinal (1993) - Levaque
 La Taule (2000) - Sanseau
 Quelqu'un de bien (2002) - Nénesse, le jardinier

External links 
 

1932 births
2011 deaths
People from Nord (French department)
French male film actors